Herlinda oligoria is a moth in the family Cosmopterigidae. It was described by John Frederick Gates Clarke in 1986. It lives on the Marquesas Islands in French Polynesia.

References

Cosmopterigidae
Moths described in 1986